Eta Eridani (η Eridani, abbreviated Eta Eri, η Eri), officially named Azha (with a silent 'h', possibly ), is a giant star in the constellation of Eridanus. Based on parallax measurements taken during the Hipparcos mission, it is approximately 137 light-years from the Sun.

Nomenclature
η Eridani (Latinised to Eta Eridani) is the star's Bayer designation.

It bore the traditional name Azha, from the old Arab asterism نَعَام أُدْحِيّ udḥiyy al-naʽām "the ostrich nest" (or "hatching place"), which included Eta Eridani. The first word, ادحى udḥiyy, was miscopied as ازحى (readable as azḥā) in medieval manuscripts.
In 2016, the International Astronomical Union organized a Working Group on Star Names (WGSN) to catalogue and standardize proper names for stars. The WGSN approved the name Azha for this star on 12 September 2016 and it is now so included in the List of IAU-approved Star Names.

Properties 

η Eridani belongs to spectral class K3 and has a giant luminosity class. It is an evolved star that has expanded to tens times the size of the sun and nearly sixty times its luminosity. It is red clump giant, a star slightly more massive than the sun which is currently fusing helium in its core. This is a mild barium star, sometimes referred to a "semi-barium" star. Although most barium stars are in binary systems, η Eridani has no known companion.

η Eridani is a high proper motion star, a relatively close star that is moving across the sky at a high rate compared to most stars. It is suspected to be a variable star with a range from magnitude 3.81 to 3.90.

References

K-type giants
Horizontal-branch stars
Barium stars
Suspected variables
High-proper-motion stars
Eridanus (constellation)
Eridani, Eta
Azha
Durchmusterung objects
Eridani, 03
018322
013701
0874